Hobart Township is one of eleven townships in Lake County, Indiana. As of the 2010 census, its population was 39,417 and it contained 16,366 housing units.

Geography

References

External links
 Indiana Township Association
 United Township Association of Indiana

Townships in Lake County, Indiana
Townships in Indiana